I Am Not Alone is an Armenian-American documentary film, directed by Garin Hovannisian and released in 2019. The film profiles Armenian politician Nikol Pashinyan and his role in the 2018 Armenian revolution.

Music for the film was composed by Serj Tankian, who also participated as an executive producer.

The film premiered at the 2019 Toronto International Film Festival, where it was named first runner-up for the People's Choice Award for Documentaries.

References

External links
 

2019 films
Armenian documentary films
American documentary films
Nikol Pashinyan
English-language Armenian films
2010s American films